Lt. Col. William Francis Cyril James Hamilton Napier, 13th Lord Napier, 4th Baron Ettrick DL (9 September 1900 – 23 August 1954) was a Scottish soldier and courtier.  He was the eldest son of Francis Napier, the 12th Lord Napier and his wife Hon. Clarice Jessie E. Hamilton, daughter of James Hamilton, 9th Lord Belhaven and Stenton.  He was educated at Wellington College and Sandhurst. He succeeded as Lord Napier and Ettrick and as chief of the name and arms of Clan Napier upon his father's death in 1941.

In 1920, he was commissioned into the King's Own Scottish Borderers, as a 2nd lieutenant, rising to the rank of lieutenant colonel by 1939.  During this time, he served as the commanding officer of the 6th Battalion of the Scottish Borderers (from 1939 to 1941), as well as assistant adjutant general of the War Office (from 1943 to 1944 – under General Sir Ronald Adam).  He was elected into the Royal Company of Archers in 1930, and held a number of political positions, including county councillor for Selkirkshire (from 1946 to 1948) and DL and JP for Selkirkshire.

In 1928, he married Violet Muir Newson, and had four children:
 Nigel Napier, 14th Lord Napier (1930–2012)
 Hon. Charles Malcolm Napier (born 1933)
 Hon. John Greville Napier (1939–1988)
 Hon. Hugh Lennox Napier (1943–1996)

Sources
 The Peerage.com
 World War II unit histories and officers

|-

1900 births
1954 deaths
People educated at Wellington College, Berkshire
William Napier, 13th Lord Napier
Barons in the Peerage of the United Kingdom
British Army personnel of World War II
King's Own Scottish Borderers officers
Councillors in Scotland
Deputy Lieutenants of Selkirkshire
Graduates of the Royal Military College, Sandhurst
Members of the Royal Company of Archers
Lords Napier
Eldest sons of British hereditary barons